Zabukovje is a dispersed settlement in the Municipality of Šentrupert in southeastern Slovenia. It lies in the hills west of Šentrupert and north of Mirna. The area is part of the historical region of Lower Carniola. The municipality is now included in the Southeast Slovenia Statistical Region.

References

External links

Zabukovje at Geopedia

Populated places in the Municipality of Šentrupert